James David Watkins (March 7, 1927 – July 26, 2012) was a United States Navy admiral and former Chief of Naval Operations who served as the United States Secretary of Energy during the George H. W. Bush administration, also chairing U.S. government commissions on HIV/AIDS and ocean policy. Watkins also served on the boards of various companies and other nongovernmental organizations and as the co-chair of the Joint Ocean Commission Initiative.

Early life and career
Watkins was born March 7, 1927, in Alhambra, California. His grandfather George Clinton Ward was president of Southern California Edison during the 1930s. His father, Edward Francis Watkins, owned the Southern California Winery Co. His mother, Louise Watkins, unsuccessfully sought the Republican nomination for Senate in 1938; he described his mother as "a woman ahead of her time."

Watkins attended Webb School of California in Claremont, California; he subsequently graduated from the United States Naval Academy in 1949 and received his master's degree in mechanical engineering from the Naval Postgraduate School in 1958.

Watkins spent 37 years in the United States Navy, serving on destroyers, cruisers and submarines, and shore assignments in personnel management. In those operations, the ship participated in events leading to the shoot-down of five North Vietnamese MiG aircraft, two by air intercept with her air controllers (1967), and three by long range surface-to-air missiles (first in US Naval history) (1967 and 1968). The longest kill was at eighty miles.

During his tenure in the Navy, Watkins served as Chief of Naval Operations, Commander of the Sixth Fleet, Vice Chief of Naval Operations, and commander-in-chief of the Pacific Fleet.

Watkins married Sheila Jo McKinney in 1950. They had six children: Katherine Marie Watkins Coopersmith, RNCS; Laura Jo Watkins Kauffmann; Charles Lancaster Watkins; Susan Elizabeth Watkins, Reverend Monsignor James David Watkins, Ph.D., Catholic priest and pastor of Saint Ann Roman Catholic Church in northwest Washington, D.C., and Edward Francis Watkins, Ph.D.

Oceans work
Watkins's ties to oceans as a graduate of the Naval Academy, a submariner and former Chief of Naval Operations, contributed to his commitment to ocean policy reform. When the Oceans Act of 2000 was passed, President George W. Bush established the U.S. Commission on Ocean Policy, and appointed Watkins to chair the commission. The 16-member commission presented recommendations for a new and comprehensive national ocean policy. Their final report, "An Ocean Blueprint for the 21st Century", was released in 2004.

Concurrently, the Pew Charitable Trusts established the Pew Oceans Commission, which was led by President Bill Clinton's former Chief of Staff Leon Panetta. The 18-member group presented its own recommendations on ocean policy to Congress and the Administration. Their final report, "America's Living Oceans: Charting a Course for Sea Change", was released in 2003.

The two reports listed strikingly similar recommendations. As a result, Congress and the Administration began to recognize the importance of ocean policy reform. To further these recommendations, and to act as one unified force, the two commissions came together in 2004 to establish the Joint Ocean Commission Initiative. Watkins co-chaired the Joint Ocean Commission Initiative with Leon Panetta, and was called on as an expert to advise and testify before Congress on ocean governance reform. He was also cited in the media as an expert on ocean issues and penned a number of opinion pieces calling for ocean reform that were published in national outlets.

Reagan Administration
President Ronald Reagan appointed Watkins as chairman of his President’s Commission on the HIV Epidemic. Watkins surprised many AIDS-awareness advocates when his conservative panel unexpectedly recommended supporting antibias laws to protect HIV-positive people, on-demand treatment for drug addicts, and the speeding of AIDS-related research.

George H. W. Bush Administration

On March 9, 1989, Watkins was sworn in as Secretary of Energy by President George H. W. Bush. He remained as Energy Secretary until 1993.

On June 27, 1989, Watkins announced the Ten-Point Plan to strengthen environmental protection and waste management activities at the United States Department of Energy's production, research, and testing facilities. In September 1989, he established the Modernization Review Committee to review the assumptions and recommendations of the 2010 Report. On November 9, 1989, Watkins established the Office of Environmental Restoration and Waste Management within the Department of Energy. On August 15, 1990, Secretary Watkins announced plans to increase oil production and decrease consumption to counter Iraqi-Kuwaiti oil losses caused by the Iraqi Invasion of Kuwait. On March 4, 1991, he transmitted the Administration's energy bill to the House and Senate. On May 10, 1992, in testimony before the Senate Armed Services Committee he reported that, for the first time since 1945, the United States was not building any nuclear weapons.

George W. Bush Administration
Watkins was appointed to what would be the second Presidential commission to be known as the "Watkins Commission" when named Chairman of the United States Commission on Ocean Policy in 2001.

Death
Watkins died of congestive heart failure on July 26, 2012, at the age of 85. He was interred at Arlington National Cemetery.

Awards and decorations

U.S. military awards and decorations

U.S. civilian awards

Foreign awards

Watkins also received decorations from Italy, France, Spain, Pakistan and Sweden.

In March 2001, Watkins was given the title of President Emeritus of the Consortium for Ocean Research and Education (CORE), and was awarded the Navy's Distinguished Public Award by the Secretary of the Navy. On April 21, 2005, the Naval Postgraduate Mechanical Engineering Building was renamed Watkins Hall, after Watkins. He was also a member of the Naval Postgraduate School (NPS) Hall of Fame.

In June 1983, Watkins was inducted as a Knight of Malta. In 1991 he was awarded the AAES Chairs' Award from the American Association of Engineering Societies.

Political positions
Watkins' positions within the United States Government include:
 Chief of Naval Operations during part of the Reagan Administration (1982–1986)
 Chairman of the Watkins Commission on AIDS (1987–1988)
 Secretary of Energy (1989–1993)
 Chairman of the United States Commission on Ocean Policy (also known as the Watkins Commission) (2001–2004)

He has also served several non-Governmental roles:
 Co-chair of the Joint Ocean Commission Initiative (JOCI) (2004–)
 A Director of the Joint Oceanographic Institutions, Inc. (1993–2000)
 A Director of GTS Duratek since April 1997
 A Director of Southern California Edison Co.
 A Director of International Technology Corp.
 A Director of Philadelphia Electric Co.
 A Director of VESTAR Inc.
 Trustee, Carnegie Corporation of New York (1993–1998)
 President of the Consortium for Oceanographic Research and Education (1994 – March 2001)
 Member, Naval Academy Endowment Trust Board of Directors
 Life Member, USNA Alumni Association
 Member of the Board of Directors of the U.S. Naval Academy Foundation

References

External links

 James David Watkins; A Compassionate Pragmatist, New York Times profile, June 4, 1988
 "Frustrated Admiral of Energy", Bulletin of the Atomic Scientists, Jan/Feb 1990
 Bio at NPR
 Joint Ocean Commission Initiative web site
 Dept. of Energy web site
 Naval Postgraduate School – Hall of Fame Recipients
 Oral History Project of The H. John Heinz III Center for Science, Economics and the Environment, Transcript of the Videotape-Recorded Interview with James D. Watkins, May 11, 2000; Interviewer: Gary Weir.
 

|-

1927 births
2012 deaths
Chiefs of Naval Operations
California Republicans
Recipients of the Legion of Merit
United States Naval Academy alumni
Vice Chiefs of Naval Operations
People from Alhambra, California
George H. W. Bush administration cabinet members
20th-century American politicians
United States Secretaries of Energy
Recipients of the Defense Distinguished Service Medal
Recipients of the Navy Distinguished Service Medal
Knights of Malta
Burials at Arlington National Cemetery